The Ren & Stimpy Show is an animated series that premiered on Nickelodeon on August 11, 1991, directly following the premieres of Doug and Rugrats, and it ran for five seasons until December 16, 1995, with the ninth and final episode of its Nick run, "A Scooter for Yaksmas". The series initially did not have a consistent grouping of segments into episodes; episodes and interstitial segments aired out of production order, some episodes and interstitials were produced for one season and aired in another, and two episodes, "Man's Best Friend" and "Sammy and Me / The Last Temptation", did not air in the series' original Nickelodeon run at all. "Man's Best Friend" aired on the Ren & Stimpy "Adult Party Cartoon" for Spike TV in 2003 alongside the uncut show's pilot, "Big House Blues". "Sammy and Me / The Last Temptation", the series' finale, aired on October 20, 1996, on MTV.

The first list is ordered according to the original television air date, and a second list provides the episode order according to the DVD releases, which groups the cartoons into 52 episodes. The list does not include episodes from Ren & Stimpy "Adult Party Cartoon".

Series overview

 
The episodes were interspersed with short segments that sometimes aired before or after the main cartoons, which are named below.

Episodes

Theatrical pilot (1990)

Season 1 (1991–92)
The season's episodes were interspersed with short segments: three "Ask Dr. Stupid" segments, three different "Log" commercials, "My Little Brother Doll", a "Powdered Toast Man" commercial, "Secret Oath", "Stimpy's Breakfast Tips", four different "What'll We Do 'Till Then?" segments, and "Yak Shaving Day".

All episodes in this season were directed by series creator John Kricfalusi, credited as "John K." in most of the episodes in this season. He is credited by his regular name in "Space Madness" and "Big House Blues", while he was credited as "Raymond Spum" in "Nurse Stimpy". In addition, the title cards for the episodes "The Littlest Giant" and "Black Hole" would have the director uncredited.

Season 2 (1992–93)
This season's episodes were interspersed with the short segments "Ace Reporter, Ren Hoek: Mr Horse Returns", "Gritty Kitty Litter", two "Log" segments, "Powdered Toast Man: Vitamin F", "Secret Club: Susan Fout", "Sugar Sod Pops", a new "What'll We Do 'Till Then? Blow Yourself Up" segment, "World Crisis with Mr. Horse", and the short segments from the previous season.

"Man's Best Friend"
Produced during the show's second season in 1992, the episode never aired on Nickelodeon. John Kricfalusi cites the violent imagery—Ren beating up George Liquor with an oar—as the primary reason for getting his production company and himself fired from the show. The episode originally aired on the Spike network as part of the 2003 Ren & Stimpy revival series Ren & Stimpy "Adult Party Cartoon". "Man's Best Friend" is included in the first and second season DVD set.

Season 3 (1993–94)
This season's episodes were interspersed with the short segments "Cheesefist", "Chicken in a Drawer", "Dog Water", "Flod", "You Are What You Eat", and short segments from previous seasons.

Season 4 (1994–95)
This season's episodes were interspersed with short segments which included "Field Guide" and short segments from previous seasons.

Season 5 (1995–96)
This season's episodes were interspersed with the short segments "Varicose Veins", "Dog Water", and "Kraftwork Corner", and short segments from previous seasons.

DVD releases

Episode order
The 2004/2005 DVD releases order the Ren & Stimpy cartoons into the following episodes:

Notes
The "No. overall" column numbers the cartoons by air date, and the "No. in season" column numbers them by their order on the DVD set.

References

External links 
 

 
1990s television-related lists
Ren
Ren
Ren